Izan Llunas is a Spanish singer and actor. He is best known for his participation in the competition program La voz kids, and for his starring role in the Netflix series Luis Miguel, based on the life on the Mexican singer Luis Miguel. 

Llunas was born in Ibiza the is the son of singer Marcos Llunas and the grandson of Dyango.

Filmography

References

External links 
 

Spanish male television actors
Living people
Spanish male singers
Year of birth missing (living people)